Harper's Island is an American horror mystery limited series created by Ari Schlossberg for CBS. Schlossberg, Jeffrey Jackson Bell and Jon Turteltaub served as executive producers. The series features an ensemble cast led by Elaine Cassidy alongside Christopher Gorham, Katie Cassidy, Cameron Richardson, Adam Campbell, C.J. Thomason, and Jim Beaver. The plot follows a group of family and friends that travel to the titular locale for a destination wedding, only to learn that there is a killer among them. At the center of the mystery is Abby Mills (Elaine Cassidy), whose mother was one of several people murdered by John Wakefield seven years prior.

The series premiered on April 9, 2009, and was marketed as a thirteen-week limited event. The final two episodes aired on July 11. By the end of its run, Harper's Island averaged 9.36 million viewers, ranking #50 in Nielsen ratings. The first three episodes aired on Thursdays, but was moved to Saturdays during the week of April 28. Because of this, Global Television Network premiered the following episodes two days prior to the United States.

On July 14, 2009, CBS cancelled the series after one season. The show gained a strong cult following since it’s release with some critics and fans noting is as ahead of it’s time

Plot
The show takes place on Harper's Island, where John Wakefield went on a killing spree and murdered a number of people before supposedly being killed by the island sheriff, Charlie Mills. One of the victims was the sheriff's wife. After her death, Sheriff Mills sends their daughter, Abby, to live with family in L.A. and she hasn't returned since. After 7 years, Abby is finally returning to the island for her best friend Henry's wedding, but now the killing starts again and everyone is a suspect. The guests manage to unlock secrets of the island and of Wakefield as the series progresses.

Cast and characters

Main
 Elaine Cassidy as Abby Mills, the groom's best friend
 Christopher Gorham as Henry Dunn, fiancé of Trish Wellington
 Katie Cassidy as Patricia 'Trish' Wellington, the radiant bride-to-be
 Gina Holden as Shea Allen, Trish's big sister and Maid of Honor
 Cameron Richardson as Chloe Carter, one of Trish's bridesmaids
 Adam Campbell as Cal Vandeusen, Chloe's boyfriend and a doctor
 Matt Barr as Christopher "Sully" Sullivan, Henry's best man
 C.J. Thomason as Jimmy Mance, a local fisherman and Abby's high school sweetheart
 Jim Beaver as Sheriff Charlie Mills, the sheriff on Harper's Island and Abby's father

Recurring
 Richard Burgi as Thomas Wellington, real estate mogul and Trish and Shea's father
 Victor Webster as Hunter Jennings, Trish's ex-college boyfriend
 Dean Chekvala as J.D. Dunn, Henry's brother
 Harry Hamlin as "Uncle" Marty Dunn, Henry and J.D.'s uncle and surrogate father
 David Lewis as Richard Allen, Shea's husband
 Cassandra Sawtell as Madison Allen, Shea and Richard's daughter
 Claudette Mink as Katherine Wellington, Trish and Shea's stepmother
 Brandon Jay McLaren as Danny Brooks, a groomsman and Henry's best friend from college
 Chris Gauthier as Malcolm Ross, a groomsman
 Sean Rogerson as Joel Booth, a groomsman
 Amber Borycki as Beth Barrington, a bridesmaid and Trish's former college roommate
 Sarah Smyth as Lucy Daramour, a bridesmaid and one of Trish's childhood friends
 Ben Cotton as Shane Pierce, a local fisherman who pretty much hates everyone
 Anna Mae Routledge as Kelly Seaver, Shane's ex-girlfriend
 Ali Liebert as Nikki Bolton, Abby's friend who manages The Cannery
 Beverly Elliott as Maggie Krell, the manager of The Candlewick Inn
 Callum Keith Rennie as John Wakefield, the perpetrator of the 2001 murders

Guest
 Julia Anderson as Tyra Coulter, a police officer from Seattle who is new to the force
 Jay Brazeau as Ike Campbell, a medical examiner
 Nicholas Carella as Patrick Lillis, the sheriff's deputy
 Clint Carleton as Ben Wellington, Trish and Shea's cousin and Thomas' nephew
 Chilton Crane as Karena Fox, a local psychic medium
 Terrence Kelly as Reverend Fain, the priest of the church
 Melanie Merkosky as Robin Matthews, newly hired journalist and main character of the Harper's Globe online series
 Maxine Miller as Julia Mitchell, a local elderly woman
 Aaron Pearl as Deputy Garrett, the sheriff's other deputy and jail guard
 Sarah-Jane Redmond as Sarah Mills, mother of Abby and wife of the sheriff, one of the victims of the 2001 murders
 Michael Rogers as Darryl Riggens, a police officer from Seattle
 Dean Wray as Cole Harkin, the survivor of the 2001 murders and the sheriff's former deputy

Development
In March 2008, CBS ordered a 15-minute pilot presentation of the project. In May 2008, the show was retooled, with Jeffrey Bell coming on board as showrunner and Jon Turteltaub as an executive producer. Schlossberg remained on board as a co-executive producer along with Karim Zriek and Dan Shotz.

Bell subsequently rewrote the first episode, which Jon Turteltaub would direct. During the retooling process, six of the pilot presentation's fifteen original cast members were replaced, including Ryan Merriman (Henry Dunn), Samantha Noble (Trish Wellington), Bill Dow (Sheriff Mills) and Bill Pullman (Uncle Marty). The roles of Thomas Wellington and Hunter Jennings were also recast.

Actors who remained with the show from pilot-presentation to the aired television pilot include Elaine Cassidy, Cameron Richardson, Adam Campbell, C.J. Thomason, Matt Barr, Cassandra Sawtell, Brandon Jay McLaren, Chris Gauthier and Sean Rogerson. The series was shot on Bowen Island, an island municipality about two kilometers west of Vancouver, British Columbia, and at the University of British Columbia.

The actors and actresses were not told about their characters' deaths until the day that each script was given. The only two actors to know the length of their contracts were Richard Burgi, as his death was seen as a major turning point in the series, and Harry Hamlin, as his contract was for a single episode.

Episodes

Ratings
Despite falling ratings, CBS aired all Harper's Island episodes, although the show was moved from its original night and time to Saturdays. At the end of the 2008-2009 television season the show ranged at #50 being viewed in approximately 9,360,000 homes in North America.

In Australia, Harper's Island ratings were very low, being beaten by competing shows on other networks. Throughout its run, the series alternated times slots. In Canada, the show continued to air Thursday nights on Global Television Network. In Denmark, Harper's Island was moved after episode 5 from Thursdays at 10:50 pm to around midnight. In Ireland the show stayed on its original Monday night airing at 10:00 pm. In the United Kingdom, the show's ratings started off under average but as the series progressed it became the BBC Three channel's number one show on Sundays, and therefore maintained the 9:00 pm slot. In Finland, the program was aired at 9:00 pm during the whole season. The series has been aired multiple times on Malaysia's RTM channel tv2, every  Wednesday and Thursday nights airing at midnight.

Harper's Globe
Harper's Globe is a social web series, designed to complement Harper's Island. The series is created by EQAL (creators of lonelygirl15, KateModern, LG15: The Resistance) and CBS Interactive. The show premiered its weekly episodes on March 18, 2009, and ran for a total of sixteen weeks. It stars Melanie Merkosky, who played the character Jennie in lonelygirl15.

Creator Miles Beckett says of the series, "The story of Harper's Globe is about a girl named Robin, with a very mysterious past, who's gone to Harper's Island to work for the newspaper, Harper's Globe, and to digitize articles from the newspaper and to create a community online for the Harper's Globe newspaper and the citizens of Harper's Island. And then she gets pulled into the story as it begins to unfold on the island."

The character Ben, who was the first character to die in Harper's Island, was first seen in a Harper's Globe episode. The series also features appearances by Harper's Island characters Sheriff Mills, Nikki Bolton, Maggie Krell and John Wakefield.

Home media
 
On September 8, 2009, CBS Home Entertainment (distributed by Paramount) released Harper's Island: The DVD Edition, a complete series box set on DVD in Region 1 for the very first time. Although the show was shot in HD, no Blu-ray Disc version of the show has been announced. The DVD set was released on February 8, 2010, for Region 2, and was released on March 4, 2010, for Region 4.

Streaming
The entire series was available on Netflix between summer 2014 and July 1, 2015, when it was removed from the service after the Netflix license had expired. The show became available on Amazon Video, free for Amazon Prime members, otherwise available for purchase.
The series is also available on Pluto TV and on The CW's free streaming platform, CW Seed. It is also available on BBC iPlayer in the UK.

References

External links
 
 Harper's Island at Rotten Tomatoes
 Harper's Island at Metacritic

2000s American drama television series
2009 American television series debuts
2009 American television series endings
2000s American television miniseries
CBS original programming
English-language television shows
Serial drama television series
2000s American horror television series
2000s American mystery television series
Television shows set in Washington (state)
Television series by CBS Studios
Television shows filmed in Vancouver
Mystery drama web series